Uricani is a town in the Jiu Valley region of Hunedoara County, in southern Transylvania, Romania.  it had a population of 8,618.

History

Uricani is first mentioned in a certified document dated 1888, when the locality was referred to as Hobicza-Urikány (in Romanian both Hobiceni-Uricani and Uricani-Hobiceni versions were used). The name of Uricani is derived from the union of two villages, Hobița (Hobica, listed in documents from 1473 first as Ohabycza) and Uric (Urik, from 1473 first as Wryk) from Hațeg Land.  After 1920 the locality's name was changed to Uricani. Over time, the village of Câmpu lui Neag functioned as either a separate commune or as a village belonging to Uricani. In 1965, Uricani was declared a city. It administers two villages, Câmpu lui Neag (Kimpulunyág) and Valea de Brazi.

Like the other Jiu Valley cities, Uricani's principal economic activities revolve around the region's coal mines, although the city, like the region, is in a period of transition as the mines have been gradually closed and many of the workers made redundant.

Location
The city location lies on the western side of Jiu Valley and at the foot of the Retezat Mountains, with the geographical coordinates of 23° 10′ meridian, east longitude and 45° 25′ parallel, north latitude.  The city is located in Hunedoara County and adjacent to Mehedinți and Gorj counties. It lies at an altitude of 729 m on the west side of the Petroșani Depression and along the West Jiu River. Its area also contains the smaller waterways of Lazarul, Valea de Pești, Buta, and Bilugu, as well as the fresh water reservoir which contains the drinking water used throughout Jiu Valley.

Uricani is accessed via the DN 66A, the 27 kilometer long west branch of the DN 66 that connects the cities of Petroșani, Vulcan, Lupeni and Uricani.

The city covers 25,141 hectares, the largest geographical area of all the Jiu Valley cities. The city limits are bordered to the east by Cow’s Valley, to the west by Retezat National Park, to the north by peaks of the Retezat Mountains (Custura, Lazarul -2282m, and Tulisa-1782m), and to the south by peaks of the Vâlcan Mountains (Coarnele-1789m and Siglaul Mare-1682m). The surrounding mountains are part of the Meridional Carpathians (in an area commonly referred to as the Transylvanian Alps).

See also
 Jiu Valley

References

External links

 Jiu Valley Portal - the regional portal host of the official Jiu Valley websites

Towns in Romania
Jiu Valley
Populated places in Hunedoara County
Localities in Transylvania
Mining communities in Romania
Monotowns in Romania